William F. Johnson (September 28, 1861 – July 17, 1942) was an American Major League Baseball outfielder. He played all or parts of five seasons in the majors.

He did not play in the majors again until , when he played in 11 games for the Indianapolis Hoosiers. He played all 11 games in right field, batting just .190. He was one of 19 different players to appear in right field that season for the Hoosiers.

He went just 2-for-15 in his first four games and was let go, ending his major league career.

External links

1861 births
1942 deaths
19th-century baseball players
Major League Baseball outfielders
Baltimore Orioles (AA) players
Baltimore Orioles (NL) players
Indianapolis Hoosiers (NL) players
Philadelphia Keystones players
Hartford Dark Blues (minor league) players
Baseball players from New Jersey